Joseph Brown (August 1, 1920 – April 3, 2009), known professionally as Victor Millan, was an American actor, academic and former dean of the theatre arts department at Santa Monica College in Santa Monica, California. Victor Millan was Brown's pseudonym used during his acting career, which spanned decades.

Early life
Brown was born on August 1, 1920. He served as a sergeant in the United States Army Air Corps during World War II. During the war, Brown was stationed in China, India and Burma.

He enrolled at the University of California, Los Angeles (UCLA) following the end of World War II. Brown earned both his bachelor's degree and his master's degree in theatre arts from UCLA.

Career
Brown, who adopted the name Victor Millan during his acting career, had over eighty separate television and film credits, in addition to his theater work. Some of his earliest roles included the 1952 film, The Ring, which was directed by Kurt Neumann, as well as Walk the Proud Land, Touch of Evil, and The FBI Story. 
In 1968 Millan appeared as Lazaro on The Big Valley in the episode titled "Miranda." 

Millan's later film credits included Doc Savage: The Man of Bronze in 1975, and the 1983 film, Scarface starring Al Pacino, in which Millan played Ariel Bleyer. Millan was an active member of the Screen Actors Guild.

Brown taught theatre arts at Santa Monica College for his entire academic teaching career. He served as the Dean of the theatre arts department at the college for over 25 years.

Victor Millan died at his home in Santa Monica, California, on April 3, 2009, at the age of 88.

Filmography

References

External links
  

1920 births
2009 deaths
American male film actors
American male television actors
University of California, Los Angeles alumni
Male actors from Santa Monica, California
United States Army Air Forces personnel of World War II
20th-century American male actors
Santa Monica College faculty
United States Army Air Forces soldiers